1978 saw the release of new video games such as Space Invaders. The year is considered the beginning of the golden age of arcade video games. The year's highest-grossing video game was Taito's arcade game Space Invaders, while the best-selling home system was the Atari Video Computer System (Atari VCS).

Financial performance

Highest-grossing arcade games 
Space Invaders was the top-grossing video game worldwide in 1978. The following table lists the top-grossing arcade games of 1978 in Japan, the United Kingdom, United States, and worldwide.

Japan 
In Japan, the following titles were the highest-grossing arcade games of 1978, according to the third annual Game Machine chart, which lists both arcade video games and electro-mechanical games (EM games) on the same arcade game chart. Taito's Space Invaders was the first video game to become highest-grossing overall arcade game on the annual Game Machine charts, after the two previous charts were topped by an EM game, F-1 by Namco.

The following titles were the highest-grossing games on each Game Machine arcade chart. Nintendo's EVR Race was the highest-grossing medal game for the third year in a row.

United States 
In the United States, the following titles were the top ten highest-grossing arcade video games of 1978, in terms of coin drop earnings according to the annual Play Meter and RePlay charts.

Best-selling home systems

Events 
 Consumer-oriented video game journalism begins with the golden age of arcade video games, soon after the success of Space Invaders, leading to hundreds of favourable articles and stories about the emerging video game medium being aired on television and printed in newspapers and magazines.
 In North America, the first regular consumer-oriented column about video games, "Arcade Alley" in Video magazine, is penned by Bill Kunkel, Arnie Katz, and Joyce Worley.

Business 
 New companies: Automated Simulations (later Epyx), Koei, Muse, Supersoft, Synergistic, U.S. Games.
 The American arcade game market earns a revenue of $1 billion (equivalent to $ in ).
 The American home video game market is worth $200 million.

Notable releases

Games 
Arcade
 June – Taito releases Space Invaders in Japan. The worldwide success of Space Invaders marks the beginning of the golden age of arcade video games. It sets the template for the fixed shooter genre and influences most subsequent shooters.
 October – Midway gives Space Invaders a wide release in North America.
 October – Namco releases their first arcade video game, Gee Bee, in Japan.
 Atari, Inc. popularizes the trackball controller with Football.
 Atari, Inc. releases Super Breakout, the multi-directionall scrolling game Fire Truck, Canyon Bomber, and Avalanche. Avalanche later inspires Activision's Kaboom!
 Konami Corporation releases their first arcade video game, Block Game.
 Nintendo releases their first arcade video game, Computer Othello.

Computer
 The book BASIC Computer Games, microcomputer edition, is released.

Hardware 
Computer
 Elektor releases the TV Games Computer.

Console
 December – Magnavox launches the Odyssey².
 APF Electronics releases the APF-M1000.
 Bally/Midway releases the Bally Professional Arcade.
 Entreprex releases the Apollo 2001.
 Interton releases the VC 4000.

See also
1978 in games

Notes

References 

Video games by year
Video games